Kendua is situated in Dhanbari Upazila under Tangail District.

Geography

Gallery

References

Populated places in Tangail District